Robert M. Williams (born May 29, 1977) is a former American football cornerback in the National Football League. He was drafted by the Kansas City Chiefs in the 5th round of the 1998 NFL Draft. Williams played college football at North Carolina.

References

Living people
1977 births
Seattle Seahawks players
Kansas City Chiefs players